Georges Couvreur (March 16, 1894 – June 21, 1957) was an American composer. His work was part of the music event in the art competition at the 1932 Summer Olympics.

References

1894 births
1957 deaths
American male composers
Olympic competitors in art competitions
People from Nord (French department)
20th-century American male musicians